Amir Mir is a veteran Pakistani journalist who is currently CEO of GNN, a digital media project. Earlier until 2019, he was working as chief operational officer of the news channel GNN as well as a founding member since the channel's inception in August 2018.Prior to this, he worked as COO with JAAG TV, as a group editor of Daily Dunya and deputy editor/editor investigations for the English-language Pakistani daily The News International, based in Lahore. Mir founded and was editor of Weekly Independent, a political weekly magazine. In January 2023, Amir Mir joined the caretaker Punjab Council of Ministers in Pakistan's Punjab as a minister.Currently he is Caretaker Information ministry government of the Punjab.

Family 

Amir Mir's eldest brother, Hamid Mir, is a Pakistani journalist working for a private news channel. An elder brother, Faisal Mir, is an industrialist. The youngest brother, Imran Mir, works for the private media sector.

Education and early career
Amir Mir graduated from Government College University. In 1993, he became a part of Pakistan's English-language daily The News International and worked as a team member of the News Bureau of Investigation. From then to 2001, Mir wrote on the political problems and issues of Pakistan.

He also wrote for various publications home and abroad such as the Inter Press Service, the Straits Times, the Gulf News and weekly The Friday Times and Monthly Newsline. Before rejoining the News in 2008, Mir had been working for the DAWN as Deputy Editor for the group's well reputed monthly magazine Herald.

Criticism of Musharraf
Amir Mir has been an outspoken critic of former Pakistani President, Gen. Pervez Musharraf, condemning him as a military dictator who violated Pakistan's democracy and constitution. When he was named Best Reporter of 2005 by the All Pakistan Newspapers Society (APNS), he refused to accept the award as it was to be presented by Musharraf, and criticised the APNS for inviting Musharraf, whom Mir called a military dictator who did not respect the freedom of expression. 

In his book, The True Face of Jehadis: Inside Pakistan's Network of Terror, Mir claimed Musharraf believes in Islamic fundamentalism. Mir accused Musharraf of making half-hearted efforts to curb radical Islamic groups operating in Pakistan.

Weekly Independent
In early 2001, Mir launched the Weekly Independent, an English news magazine, as the project director cum editor.

Publications
The True Face of Jehadis – was published by the Lahore-based Mashal Books in 2006, its Indian edition was published by the New Delhi-based Roli Books the same year. The Japanese edition got into print in 2008 by Tokyo-based The English Agency.

The Fluttering Flag of Jehad - was also published by the Mashal Books in 2008.

Talibanization of Pakistan: From 9/11 to 26/11 was published by the New Delhi-based Pentagon Press in 2009. 

 The Bhutto Murder Trail: From Waziristan to GHQ – was published in 2010 by the New Delhi-based Tranquebar Press, both in English and Hindi.

Much before that, Amir Mir also co-authored Most Wanted: Profiles of Terror – published by the Roli Books in 2002. He wrote the foreword to A to Z of Jehadi Organizations, published by the Mashal Books in 2004.

Mir has been criticised within Pakistan for writing articles that are claimed to be damaging to Pakistan's standing in the world. Maj. Gen. Rashid Qureshi of the Pakistani army accused Mir of being an "Indian agent" after he published an article in Outlook, an Indian news magazine. Mir claimed harassment from officials in the Pakistani government and has reportedly told friends and family that president Pervez Musharraf was to be held responsible for any harm to his life or person. In a report highlighting threats to press freedom in Pakistan, Human Rights Watch claimed that Mir had been threatened by Musharraf, and claimed that Mir's car was set on fire in November 2003 as an act of intimidation and harassment.

US drone strikes

Mir has been critical of US Predator drone attacks in Pakistan, stating that large numbers of civilians have been killed. On 10 April 2009, Mir told the Pakistan newspaper The News International that 687 civilians and only 14 high-value Al Qaeda targets were killed so far in the strikes. 

On 1 February 2010, Mir reported that 123 civilians and 3 Al Qaeda fighters were killed in 10 drone strikes in January 2010. The Jamestown Foundation criticised Mir's numbers, stating that there had been 16.5 suspected militants killed for every civilian as of June 2010, according to the foundation's analysis of Western and Pakistani news sources. 

The Long War Journal, through reports from various media outlets and US intelligence officials, estimated in July 2011 that the drone strikes in Pakistan had killed 2,018 militants and only 138 civilians since 2006.

References

External links
 The Bhutto Murder Trial, goodreads.com
 Amir Mir quits GNN with a heavy heart, journalismpakistan.com
 Amir Mir biography, gatestoneinstitute.org
 RSF condemns threats against journalist Amir Mir, ifex.org

Pakistani male journalists
Pakistani writers
Living people
Pakistani people of Kashmiri descent
University of the Punjab alumni
Government College University, Lahore alumni
Journalists from Lahore
People from Sialkot
Year of birth missing (living people)